The Alive Galaxy Tour (referred to as the Alive Tour) was the first worldwide concert tour and sixth overall by South Korean boy band Big Bang. It promotes the group's fifth Korean-language EP, Alive (as well as their fourth Japanese-language studio album of the same name), across four continents: Asia, North America, South America and Europe. The group hired choreographer and creative director Laurieann Gibson to direct the show. The tour was officially sponsored by Samsung GALAXY.

In total, an estimated 800,000 fans worldwide attended the tour.

Background and development

In support of their fifth extended Korean-language EP, Alive and their fourth Japanese-language studio album of the same name, released February 29 and March 28, 2012, respectively, BigBang's record label YG Entertainment announced that the group intended to hold a world tour in partnership with tour promoter Live Nation, visiting Asia, North America, South America and Europe. Live Nation president Alan Ridgeway stated, "We are very happy that we are working with YG Entertainment and Big Bang to show [our work] to worldwide K-pop fans." A representative for YG Entertainment followed this with, "We are working hard to hold the best concert with the best production team to equal the anticipation of the world fans who are waiting for the first concert they will get to meet Big Bang.

Choreographer and creative director Laurieann Gibson, famed for her work with Lady Gaga, was hired as the tour's director and choreographer. US-based visual contents company Possible Productions was hired to create the Alive tour's custom backdrops. The team described the concept as a "bleak futuristic world [that could only be] saved by Big Bang." Lighting and staging, as well as overall production, was designed by Leroy Bennet. Staging and lighting alone was estimated at US$1.3 million. Korean electronics brand Samsung was contracted as the tour's official sponsor, who provided electronics for the members and touring staff on the dates. This marks the first time the group has conducted a worldwide concert tour.

Commercial performance

Tickets for the group's world tour, which kicked off in Seoul in March 2012, sold out faster than Live Nation had anticipated. In Singapore, all tickets were sold out shortly after its on sale and a second show was immediately announced to cope with the huge ticket demand from fans. Later in Malaysia, they attracted more than 3,500 fans to queue up at the box office to fight for their tickets. In Taiwan, all 22,000 tickets of their 2 shows were sold out within just a few hours.

Owing to strong demand from fans in the United States, two additional concert dates in both Los Angeles and New Jersey, November 2 and November 8, were added. There were initially doubts if T.O.P could perform due to an injury, but it was reported that he would continue to perform. In Japan, BigBang became the first Korean artist to perform three Dome concerts, at the Tokyo Dome, Kyocera Dome, and Fukuoka Dome.

Ticket prices for their concert in Hong Kong were reported to cost as much as $1,680 HKD (more than 200 US Dollars) The concert was held in Lima, Peru on November 14, 2012. The Orange County Register reported that ticket prices ranged from $50 to $300 for the group's Honda Center dates in Los Angeles. In the UK all the tickets for the Wembley Arena show sold out within two hours of tickets going on sale, resulting in a second date being added shortly after. They also managed to set a London concert record for the largest crowd gathered to see a Korean act in the United Kingdom.

The tour listed on Pollstar'''s year-end list, on the Top 200 North American Tours, BigBang become the first Korean artist to have made the list, as they ranked at number 155 and earned $5 million from four shows.

 Critical reception The New York Times journalist Jon Caramanica wrote that BigBang performed more than two dozen songs wearing almost as many outfits, and in unusual setups such as "taking the stage on gilded Segways and lowrider bicycles" during their "short but loud American tour".Billboard K-Town columnist Jeff Benjamin reported that concertgoers were treated to breakdancing and Taeyang's gymnastics for a few on-stage flips during BigBang's concert at the Prudential Center in New Jersey, and described the band's concerts in America as "a success for all".

Joseph Lapin from the Californian newspaper OC Weekly attended BigBang's concert in Los Angeles and reported that the atmosphere during the show was "almost palpable". Lapin concluded, "It was nostalgic, a throwback to old-school hip-hop but with a commercial twist and a foreign reinterpretation...these boys, well, they'll be back, and they know they're going to be superstars".The Guardian's music journalist Caroline Sullivan praised BigBang for holding a "fabulous spectacle" at the Wembley Arena in London. She compared BigBang with other Western music bands, and noted that BigBang's edges "are crisper, the sound louder, the dancing sharper".Radio Programas del Perú'' ranked the tour as the best K-pop concert in South America for 2012, beating out earlier concerts performed by JYJ, U-Kiss and a Music Bank (TV series) concert at Chile.

Set list

Tour dates

Box office data

Awards

Personnel
 Primary artist: BigBang
 Show director: Laurieann Gibson
 Stage design, lighting design: Leroy Bennett 
 Sound: Ken Van Druten 
 Visual plans, projections: Possible Productions 
 Music director, keyboard: Gil Smith II
 Guitar: Justin Lyons 
 Programmer: Adrian Porter
 Keys: Dante "Inferno" Jackson
 Bass: Omar Dominick
 Drums: Bennie "BrIIghtReD" Rodgers II
 Dancers: HiTech Dancers and Crazy Girls, featured break dancers
 Management: YG Entertainment
 Tour organizer: Live Nation Korea
 Tour manager: Shirley Hong
 Sponsorship: Samsung

TV broadcast

References

External links
Alive Tour Seoul concert video at MTV Iggy (official, legal  broadcast)

2012 concert tours
2013 concert tours
BigBang (South Korean band) concert tours
Concert tours of North America
Concert tours of the United States
Concert tours of the United Kingdom
Concert tours of South America
Concert tours of Asia
Concert tours of Japan